Maad Dad is a 2013 Malayalam film, directed by Revathy S Varmha, starring Lal, Nazriya Nazim, Meghana Raj, Lalu Alex, Padmapriya and Pooja Gandhi. It marked Nazriya’s debut film as a leading actress.

Cast
 Lal as Palachottil Geevargees Kuriyakose Isow
 Nazriya Nazim as Mariya
 Meghana Raj as Anuradha/Annamma (Wife of Palachottil Geevargees Kuriyakose Isow)
 Lalu Alex as Soda Mathan (Bony's Dad)
 Padmapriya as Dr. Rasiya
 Pooja Gandhi as Lisa
 Vijayaraghavan as Krishnettan
 Balu R Nair as Ansari
 Janardanan as Mamachan
 Aiswarya as Sosamma (Mrs. Mathan)
 Sreejith Vijay as Bonnie (Love interest of Mariya)
 Kovai Sarala as Dawini D’Zosa
 Salim Kumar as Giridhar
 Shari as Sarala
Balu Varghesse as Young Easho
 Lakshmi Priya as Omana

Production
Mohanlal was to play the title role first, but he was replaced by Lal. Also Shweta Menon was first signed for a role but had to opt out due to pregnancy. She was replaced by Padmapriya. Archana Kavi, who was to play an important role, has been replaced by Nazriya Nazim.

Critical reception
Malayala Manorama called it  a good movie.  Other critics were negative about the film's qualities.

References

2010s Malayalam-language films